Dame Rosemary Anne Squire, DBE (born 27 May 1956) is a British commercial theatre owner and entrepreneur. She is the founder of the Ambassador Theatre Group (ATG) Ltd. Squire and co-founder of Trafalgar Entertainment.

Early life and education
Squire was born in Nottingham, England, on 27 May 1956. From 1967 to 1974, Squire attended Nottingham Girls' High School. She studied at Southampton University between 1975 and 1979, earning a BA in Spanish, and worked at the University of Barcelona 1977–78 as an English language assistant. Squire then studied at Brown University from 1979 to 1980 on a postgraduate scholarship.

Career 
Squire arrived in Theatreland in 1980. She held various administrative roles at Wyndham's Theatres Ltd. In 1984, she was a manager of Maxbox Group plc, the second largest group of West End theatres. In 1988, she became the manager of the theatre production company Turnstyle Group Ltd, of which she then became executive director. In 1991 she co-produced the West End revival of the musical Carmen Jones.

Squire and her husband Howard Panter established the Ambassador Theatre Group in 1992, with the acquisitions of the Duke of York's Theatre, a management contract of the Ambassadors Theatre, and a cinema complex in Woking. In 1995, ATG acquired the Ambassadors Theatre, which was renamed New Ambassadors Theatre in 1999. Between 1996 and 1997, the group expanded further with contracts for the Milton Keynes Theatre and the Regent Theatre, as well as Victoria Hall. In 1997, Squire became executive director of the Ambassador Theatre Group.

2000s 
In 2000, ATG acquired Churchill Theatre, Richmond Theatre, Albery Theatre, Donmar Warehouse, Fortune Theatre, Phoenix Theatre, Piccadilly Theatre, Comedy Theatre, Trafalgar Studios, Wyndhams Theatre, Playhouse Theatre, and the Theatre Royal Brighton. Squire joined the board of management of the Society of London Theatres and the advisory panel of Arts Council Capital. The expansion of ATG continued with the acquisition of two Scottish venues (King's Theatre and Theatre Royal Glasgow) and the reopening and rebranding of the New Wimbledon Theatre in 2004. Squire was elected a Fellow of the Royal Society of Arts and joined the board of Donmar Warehouse Productions.

In June 2005, Squire became the first democratically elected president of the Society of London Theatre (the trade organisation of London's theatre owners and managers), and the second-only female president in the organisation's 100-year history. She campaigned to improve the West End theatre-going environment and to secure vital funding for capital improvements to protect the long-term future of London's historic theatres. Squire became a member of The Arts Council of England Lottery Advisory Panel from 2000 to 2005 and is a member of the Theatrical Management Association.

In 2009, Squire was appointed a National Member of the Arts Council England Board. She was Chair of Great Ormond Street Hospital's Theatres for Theatres Appeal and vice-chairman of Dance Umbrella. She is also a Trustee of The Hall of Cornwall. In February 2009, ATG acquired the Aylesbury Waterside Theatre. In November 2009, ATG realigned its shareholding to bring in private equity group Exponent for a deal to secure the funding for the acquisition of Live Nation's UK Theatre portfolio. Following this, ATG became the largest theatre group in the UK. Panter remained a joint-owner and became joint Chief Executive and Creative Director. Greg Dyke became the Executive Chairman of the larger group.

2010s 
In 2010, ATG opened the Aylesbury Waterside Theatre. In the same year, London's Evening Standard named Squire and her husband as the most influential people in British theatre in their list of "London's 1000 most influential people 2010". In 2011, ATG launched their Manchester Gets it First (MGiF) initiative. In February 2013, Squire appeared at number 16 on the inaugural BBC Radio 4 Woman's Hour Power List, intended to serve as a snapshot of the 100 most powerful British women.

In 2014, Squire topped The Stage 100 list for the fifth consecutive year, equaling the run previously set by Andrew Lloyd Webber. From 2010 to 2016, Squire topped the list seven times.

In March 2015, Squire announced The SPACe (the Squire Performing Arts Centre) at Nottingham Girl's High School. Squire was Chair of the 'Raise the Curtain' Development Board, which was created to oversee the project. Squire officially opened The SPACe in April 2017.

In 2016, Squire stepped down from their roles at Ambassador Theatre Group to concentrate on new projects They co-founded a new live entertainment business, Trafalgar Entertainment, and acquired the two-space West End theatre, Trafalgar Studios.

In December 2017, Squire was appointed Chair of Arts Council South West.

Personal life
Squire married Alan Brodie in 1982, with whom she had two children. She divorced Brodie in 1994 and married Howard Panter the same year, with whom she had one child.

Productions
Produced by Rosemary Squire unless otherwise noted.
 9 to 5 (UK tour and London)
 A Day in the Death of Joe Egg, 2019 London
 A Midsummer Night's Dream, 2003 London
 Admissions, 2019 London and UK Tour
 After Mrs Rochester, 2003, London
 All New People (UK regions and London)
 Annie Get Your Gun, 2014 UK tour
 Apologia, 2018 London
 Being Shakespeare (London, UK tour, New York and Chicago)
 Blue/Orange (UK tour)
 Carmen Jones, 1991 London
 Company, 2006–2007 Broadway
 Dandy Dick (UK tour)
 Dirty Rotten Scoundrels, 2014 London
 Education, Education, Education, 2019 London
 Elling, 2007 London and, 2010 Broadway
 Equus, 2019 London
 Exit The King, 2009 Broadway
 Far Away, 2000 and 2001 London
 Fat Pig, 2008 London
 Ghost The Musical, 2011 Manchester, 2011 London
 Goodnight Mister Tom (London)
 Guys and Dolls, 2005–2007 London, 2006 and 2007 UK Tour, 2008–2009 Australia, 2009 Broadway
 Inala, 2015 (London and UK Tour)
 Joe Egg, 2001 London, 2003 Broadway, 2009 UK Tour
 Jersey Boys (London)
 Jersey Boys, 2017 UK Tour
 Killer Joe, 2018 London
 La Cage Aux Folles (national US tour)
 Legally Blonde, 2009 London
 Legally Blonde (London, national tour and Sydney)
 Love Me Tender, 2015 (UK Tour)
 Macbeth (London)
 Mary Stuart, 2018 London
 Matthew Bourne's Highland Fling, 2005 London, 2005 UK Tour
 Matthew Bourne's Nutcracker!, 2002, 2003, 2007–08 London, 2003 and 2008 UK Tour, 2004 Worldwide Tour
 Misty, 2018 London
 Maurice's Jubilee (UK tour)* Monkee Business (regional tour)
 Mouth To Mouth, 2001 London
 My One and Only, 2002 London
 Nine Night, 2019 London
 Noises Off, 2001, 2002 and 2003 London, 2008 UK Tour, 2001 Broadway
 Oresteia, 2015 London
 Passion Play (London)
 Porgy and Bess, 2006–07 London
 Posh, Jumpy and Constellations (Royal Court at the Duke of York's, London)
 Pretending To Be Me, 2003 London
 Priscilla, Queen of the Desert (UK tour)
 Richard III, 2014 London
 Riflemind, 2008 London
 Rocky Horror Show, 2009–10 UK Tour, 2008 Australia
 The Rocky Horror Show 40th Anniversary (UK tour)
 The Rocky Horror Show, 2018 UK Tour and International Tour
 Shakespeare, The Man from Stratford, 2010 UK Tour
 Shockheaded Peter, 2001 and 2002 London
 Smokey Joe's Café, 1996–98 London
 South Pacific (London and national tour)
 Spamalot (London and UK tour)
 Stephen Poliakoff's Sweet Panic, 2003–04 London
 Sunset Boulevard, 2008–2009 London
 Sweeney Todd, 2004–05 London, 2006 UK Tour, 2005–06 Broadway
 The Grinning Man, 2018 London
 The Height of The Storm, 2018 London
 The Homecoming, 2015 London
 The Hothouse, 2013 London
 The King and I, 2018 – London, UK and International Tour
 The Last Cigarette, 2009 London
 The Lover The Collection, 2008 London
 The Messiah, 2018 London and UK Tour
 The Misanthrope, 2009 London
 The Mountaintop, 2009 London
 The Mountaintop (Broadway)
 The Mystery of Charles Dickens, 2000, 2001 and 2002 London, 2002 Broadway
 The Mystery of Charles Dickens 2012 (London)
 The New Statesman, 2006–07 London, 2006 UK Tour
 The Pride, 2014 London and UK tour
 The Ruling Class, 2015 London
 The Starry Messenger, 2019 London
 The Three Sisters, 2003 London
 Vincent In Brixton, 2002, 2002 and 2003 London, 2003 UK Tour, 2003 Broadway
 Vulcan VII, 2018 UK Tour
 The Weir, 1997 and 1998 London, 1999 Broadway
 West Side Story, 2008 London, 2008–09 UK Tour, 1995 and 1996–97 Australia
 Women on the Verge of a Nervous Breakdown, 2014 London

Honors and awards
 2006 – CBI Real Business First Women Award for Tourism and Leisure
 2007 – OBE for Services to Theatre
 2008 – Entrepreneur of the Year – Regional Finalist
 2012 – named one of the 250 of the most influential people in Greater Manchester at the Manchester Evening News'' Awards
 2013 – Squire was listed first in the Evening Standard 'Power 1000' Theatre section.
 2013 – assessed as the 16th most powerful woman in the United Kingdom by Woman's Hour on BBC Radio 4.
 2014 – EY Entrepreneur of the Year.
 2018 – named Dame Commander of the Order of the British Empire.
 2019 – Honorary Freedom of the Borough.

References

1956 births
Living people
British theatre managers and producers
Women theatre managers and producers
Dames Commander of the Order of the British Empire
People educated at Nottingham Girls' High School
People from Nottingham
Wives of knights